Events in the year 1924 in Portugal.

Incumbents
President: Manuel Teixeira Gomes
Prime Minister: Alfredo Rodrigues Gaspar

Events

Arts and entertainment

Sports
 8 June - Campeonato de Portugal Final, in Lisbon
Sport Benfica e Castelo Branco founded

Births
7 December – Mário Soares, president

Deaths

28 January – Teófilo Braga, playwright and politician (born 1843).

References

 
1920s in Portugal
Years of the 20th century in Portugal
Portugal
Portugal